Chok Sukkaew, simply known as Chok. He is a Thai footballer from Buriram Province, Thailand.

Clubs 

Senior

Honours

Ubon UMT United

Buriram F.C.
Regional League Division 2
 Winners  :2010
Regional League North-East Division
 Runner-up  :2010

External links

1987 births
Living people
Chok Sukkaew
Chok Sukkaew
Chok Sukkaew
Chok Sukkaew
Chok Sukkaew
Chok Sukkaew
Association football defenders